Kalpesh Ashok Patel (born 18 July 1985) is a former Kenyan cricketer who played two One Day Internationals for the national side, although he had no success in either.

Patel's ODIs are the only List A games he played, but he appeared four times at first-class level. He took only three wickets, but did dismiss Scotland's Gavin Hamilton in both innings of a match during the 2004 ICC Intercontinental Cup.

Patel once promised to become a very good cricketer: Andy Moles watched him play at Under-19 level and compared his bowling style with that of Terry Alderman, although he felt that his future was probably more as a batting all-rounder. Moles also praised Patel's "superb" fielding.

He did not play any major cricket since 2006.

Notes

References
 

1985 births
Living people
Kenyan cricketers
Kenya One Day International cricketers